The 2017 FFA Cup preliminary rounds was the qualifying competition to decide 21 of the 32 teams which took part in the 2017 FFA Cup Round of 32, along with the 10 A-League clubs and reigning National Premier Leagues champion (Sydney United 58). The preliminary rounds operated within a consistent national structure whereby club entry into the competition is staggered in each federation, with the winning clubs from Round 7 of the preliminary rounds in each member federation gaining entry into the Round of 32. All Australian clubs were eligible to enter the qualifying process through their respective FFA member federation, however only one team per club was permitted entry in the competition.

Schedule
The number of fixtures for each round, and the match dates for each Federation, are as follows.

 Some round dates in respective Federations overlap due to separate scheduling of Zones/Sub-Zones.

Format
The preliminary rounds structures were as follows, and refer to the different levels in the unofficial Australian association football league system :

First qualifying round:
18 Victorian clubs level 9 and below entered this stage.
Second qualifying round:
56 Victorian clubs (9 from the previous round and 47 level 8) entered this stage.
First round:
10 Northern NSW clubs level 4 and below entered this stage.
88 Victorian clubs (28 from the previous round and 60 level 6–7) entered this stage.
Second round:
18 New South Wales clubs level 6 and below entered this stage.
52 Northern NSW clubs (5 from the previous round and 52 level 4 and below) entered this stage.
Queensland: 38 Brisbane-based clubs level 4 and below entered this stage.
20 South Australian clubs level 3–5 entered this stage.
80 Victorian clubs (44 from the previous round and 36 level 5–6) entered this stage.
10 Western Australian clubs level 6 and below entered this stage.
Third round:
11 Australian Capital Territory clubs level 3 and below entered this stage.
116 New South Wales clubs (9 from the previous round and 107 level 4 and below) entered this stage.
41 Northern NSW clubs (30 from the previous round and 11 level 3) entered this stage.
6 Northern Territory clubs level 2 and below entered this stage.
Queensland: 39 Brisbane-based clubs (19 from the previous round and 20 level 3–4) entered this stage.
32 South Australian clubs (10 from the previous round and 22 level 2–3) entered this stage.
8 Tasmanian clubs level 3 entered this stage.
64 Victorian clubs (40 from the previous round and 24 level 4) entered this stage.
32 Western Australian clubs (10 from the previous round and 28 level 3–5) entered this stage.
Fourth round:
 16 Australian Capital Territory clubs (7 from the previous round and 9 level 2) entered this stage.
80 New South Wales clubs (58 from the previous round and 22 level 2–3) entered this stage.
31 Northern NSW clubs (21 from the previous round and 10 level 2) entered this stage.
6 Northern Territory clubs (3 from the previous round and 3 level 2 and below) entered this stage.
42 Queensland clubs progressed to this stage.
16 South Australian clubs progressed to this stage.
16 Tasmanian clubs (4 from the previous round and 12 level 2–3) entered this stage.
64 Victorian clubs (32 from the previous round and 32 level 2–3) entered this stage.
32 Western Australian clubs (19 from the previous round and 13 level 2) entered this stage.
Fifth round:
8 Australian Capital Territory clubs progressed to this stage.
40 New South Wales clubs progressed to this stage.
16 Northern New South Wales clubs progressed to this stage.
7 Northern Territory clubs (3 from the previous round and 4 level 2–3) entered this stage.
32 Queensland clubs (22 from the previous round and 10 level 2) entered this stage.
8 South Australian clubs progressed to this stage.
8 Tasmanian clubs progressed to this stage.
32 Victorian clubs progressed to this stage.
16 Western Australian clubs progressed to this stage.
Sixth round:
4 Australian Capital Territory clubs progressed to this stage.
20 New South Wales clubs progressed to this stage.
8 Northern New South Wales clubs progressed to this stage.
4 Northern Territory clubs progressed to this stage.
16 Queensland clubs progressed to this stage.
4 South Australian clubs progressed to this stage.
4 Tasmanian clubs progressed to this stage.
16 Victorian clubs progressed to this stage.
8 Western Australian clubs progressed to this stage.
Seventh round:
2 Australian Capital Territory clubs progressed to this stage, which was also the Final of the Federation Cup.
10 New South Wales clubs progressed to this stage. The 5 winners – along with the reigning National Premier Leagues champion Sydney United 58 – also participated in the Waratah Cup.
4 Northern New South Wales clubs progressed to this stage.
2 Northern Territory clubs progressed to this stage – the winners of the Darwin-based and Alice Springs-based knockout competitions – which doubled as the final of the Sport Minister's Cup.
8 Queensland clubs progressed to this stage.
2 South Australian clubs progressed to this stage, which was also the Grand Final of the Federation Cup.
2 Tasmanian clubs progressed to this stage, which was also the Grand Final of the Milan Lakoseljac Cup.
8 Victorian clubs progressed to this stage. The 4 winners also qualified to the semi-finals of the Dockerty Cup.
4 Western Australian clubs progressed to this stage. The 2 winners also progressed to the Final of the Football West State Cup.

Note: Sydney United 58 did not participate in the New South Wales qualifying rounds, as they have already qualified into the FFA Cup as 2016 National Premier Leagues champions.

Note: A-League Youth teams playing in their respective federation leagues were specifically excluded from the preliminary rounds as their respective Senior A-League clubs are already part of the competition.

Key to Abbreviations

First qualifying round

Notes:
 w/o = Walkover

Second qualifying round

Notes:
 w/o = Walkover
 † = After Extra Time

First round

Notes:
 w/o = Walkover
 † = After Extra Time
 QLD Byes – Beerwah Glasshouse United (3), Bribie Island Tigers (6), Caloundra FC (3), Kawana FC (3), Maroochydore FC (3), Noosa Lions (3) and Woombye FC (3).

Second round

 w/o = Walkover
Notes:
 † = After Extra Time
 NNSW Byes – Port Saints (4), Stockton Sharks (5) and Urunga FC (4).
 WA Byes – Albany Bayswater (-), Albany Rovers (-) and Boulder City (-).

Third round

Notes:
 w/o = Walkover
 † = After Extra Time
 ACT Byes – Australian National University (3), O'Connor Knights (3) and Queanbeyan City (3).
 NNSW Byes –  Coffs City United (4).
 QLD Byes – Across The Waves (3), Emerald Eagles (3), Mackay City Brothers (3), Mackay Lions (3), Mackay Wanderers (3), Toowong FC (5) and United Warriors (3).

Fourth round

Notes:
 w/o = Walkover
 † = After Extra Time
 NNSW Bye – Valentine Phoenix (2).

Fifth round

Notes:
 w/o = Walkover
 † = After Extra Time
 NT Bye – Mindil Aces (2)

Sixth round

Notes:
 † = After Extra Time

Seventh round

References

External links
 Official website

FFA Cup preliminary
FFA Cup preliminary
Australia Cup preliminary rounds